Dahlgren Chapel may refer to:

 Dahlgren Chapel of the Sacred Heart, the primary Catholic chapel on the main campus of Georgetown University
 Dahlgren Chapel (Maryland), a stone chapel in western Maryland built by the Dahlgren family

See also 
 
Dahlgren (surname)
Dahlgren (disambiguation)